"Good Thing" is a song recorded by British band Fine Young Cannibals, released as the second single from their second and last album, The Raw & the Cooked (1989). The song was their second and final #1, topping the Billboard Hot 100 on 8 July 1989. It also peaked at #7 on the UK Singles Chart. The song made its first appearance in Tin Men (1987). Fine Young Cannibals portrayed a nightclub band in the movie, performing this song and three others (including the single's b-side "Social Security"). The film is set in Baltimore in 1963, and the song's retro soul style is consistent with that setting. Jools Holland played piano on the track, noting that it was "one of the biggest selling records I've ever played on".

Music video
The accompanying music video for "Good Thing" features many scenes with the Orribly Good Scooter Club, the Jokers and A41 Eagles displaying their motor scooters, both at rest and in motion, as part of scooter boy culture. The scooters featured include stock scooters, as well as highly stylised scooters and minimalist cutdown scooters.

In popular culture
The song was featured in the trailer for Mad Dog and Glory (1993) and in TV spots for Passed Away (1992)
Twice during 1998, the song was featured in episodes of Top Gear, first in a used car review of the Volkswagen Golf, with a voiceover by presenter Quentin Willson, the second in the beginning of the review of the Alfa Romeo 166, with scenes showing Alfa Romeo 156s. In 2007, the song was used in adverts for the Chevrolet Captiva (United Kingdom).

The song appears in Doomsday (2008), starring Rhona Mitra, in a surreal scene involving the film's main antagonist.  It was also used in the film It's Complicated (2009), in the scene at the graduation party. It plays as Alec Baldwin walks towards Meryl Streep and Steve Martin, after noticing the two are obviously high.

Track listings
 7" single
 "Good Thing" – 3:22
 "Social Security" – 3:26

 12" maxi
 "Good Thing" (Prince Paul remix) – 5:30
 "Good Thing" (7" mix) – 3:22
 "Good Thing" (Nothing Like the Single Mix - Instrumental) – 4:38

 10" limited edition
 "Good Thing" – 3:22
 "Good Thing (Double Groove Alternate)" – 3:22
 "Social Security" – 3:26

 CD maxi
 "Good Thing" (7" mix) – 3:25
 "Good Thing" (Nothing Like the Single Mix) – 4:42
 "She Drives Me Crazy" (Monie Love Remix) – 5:59

Charts

Weekly charts

Year-end charts

References

Fine Young Cannibals songs
1987 songs
1989 singles
Billboard Hot 100 number-one singles
Cashbox number-one singles
RPM Top Singles number-one singles
Songs written by David Steele (musician)
Songs written by Roland Gift
London Records singles